Snake oil is a fraudulent marketing allusion to the selling of fake medicines.

Snake oil may refer to:

 Snake oil (cryptography), a fraudulent cryptographic method
 Snake oil method for generating functions
 Snakeoil (album), a 2012 album by Tim Berne
 Diplo Presents Thomas Wesley, Chapter 1: Snake Oil, a 2020 album by Thomas Wesley
 Snake Oil and Other Preoccupations, a book by John Diamond (2001)
 "Snake Oil", a song by Steve Earle off of the album  Copperhead Road (1988)